KTLB (105.9 FM) is a radio station that broadcasts from Fort Dodge, Iowa (licensed to Twin Lakes, Iowa). The station broadcasts a classic hits music format as "105.9 The Beach". The station is owned by Alpha Media, through licensee Digity 3E License, LLC.

Previously, the station was known as 105.9 The Beach, broadcasting an oldies format. Then sometime in late 2012, it has jettisoned the oldies playlist for Christmas music. As of December 26, KTLB switched their stunt to various versions of Iron Butterfly's In-A-Gadda-Da-Vida; the following day, the stunt switched to a loop of David Bowie's "Changes". On January 1, 2013, KTLB launched a classic hits format branded as "Hippie Radio 105.9", and later rebranded as "105.9 The Beach."

References

External links
Three Eagles Communications

TLB
Radio stations established in 1992
Classic hits radio stations in the United States